Breakout was a Polish blues rock band, formed on 1 February 1968.

History
After a few years of playing as Blackout, the first performance of Breakout took place at the Musicorama festival in February 1968. In April the new bass player - Michał Muzolf, joined the group. In June the band toured in the countries of Benelux. After the band returned to Poland, they became one of the most famous Polish rock bands, owing much to a new sound-kit brought from western Europe, but also as they were arguably the first group to play blues rock in Poland.

In November, Breakout played a few concerts all around Poland. In January and February 1969 their song "Gdybyś kochał, hej!" topped the radio chart list.

In 1969 they released their first album Na drugim brzegu tęczy, which they had recorded without K. Dłutowski, but with Włodzimierz Nahorny, who played the saxophone and flute. In August, Breakout took the new bass-player Piotr Nowak, but just at the beginning of 1970, he was replaced by Józef Skrzek. The same year Franciszek Walicki (manager) left the band.

In 1970, the band was more and more criticised by Polish mass media for pro-West lifestyle and long hair. As a result, the radio and TV stopped broadcasting their songs.

In 1971, Breakout accomplished arguably their best album: Blues. It was recorded by: Tadeusz Nalepa (vocal, lead guitar), Dariusz Kozakiewicz (guitar), Tadeusz Trzciński (harmonica), Jerzy Goleniewski (bass), Józef Hajdasz (drums).

Next year they recorded their fourth album Karate. After the recording was finished Jan Izbiński (vocal) joined for a short time. Karate turned out to be their best selling work to date. In 1973 year Włodzimierz Nahorny left Breakout, and the musicians helped to record the solo album of Mira Kubasińska Ogień.

Between 1973 and 1975 the band went on concerts to USSR, England and the Netherlands.

In 1974 Breakout recorded their fifth album Kamienie, which was recorded by: Tadeusz Nalepa (lead guitar, harmonica, vocal), Winicjusz Chróst (guitar), Zdzisław Zawadzki (bass), Wojciech Morawski (drums). On 21 November 1974, the band received the Golden Plate for Karate. Throughout 1975 there were many personal changes within the band, and at the beginning of the next year the personnel was established as: Mira Kubasińska (vocal), Tadeusz Nalepa (guitar), Zbigniew Wypych (bass), Bogdan Lewandowski (keyboards), Andrzej Tylec (drums). With these members Breakout recorded an album called NOL.

Fans had to wait till 1979 for the new album. Żagiel ziemi, recorded with Roman "Pazur" Wojciechowski, was a part of the Olympian Triptych prepared for the Olympics 1980 in Moscow, and simultaneously they recorded next album called ZOL.

The band ceased to exist in 1982 when the band leader Tadeusz Nalepa began the solo career. Up to the present day the band has been often reactivated for various events and concerts.

On 19 June 2007, in Rzeszów, the Breakout Festival was organized in memory of Mira Kubasińska and Tadeusz Nalepa.

Band members
Tadeusz Nalepa (1943–2007) - guitar, harmonica, vocal
Mira Kubasińska (1944–2005) - vocal
Janusz Zieliński - bass
Krzysztof Dłutowski - keyboards
Józef Hajdasz - drums

Discography

Studio albums
Blackout (1968)
Na drugim brzegu tęczy (1969)
70A (1970)
Blues (1971)
Karate (1972)
Ogień (1973)
Kamienie (1974)
NOL (1976)
ZOL (1979)
Żagiel ziemi (1980)

Compilations
Blackout (2) (1994)
Breakout 1969/70 (1996)
Ballady (1995)

External links
 Nalepa's Discography
 Breakout on Europopmusic.eu (English)
 Polish Rock Archives: Breakout
 Festival Breakout

Polish blues rock musical groups
Musical groups established in 1968
Musical groups disestablished in 1982
Polish rock music groups